The Seven Churches Visitation is a Christian, especially Roman Catholic, Lenten tradition to visit seven churches on the evening of Maundy Thursday. Following the Mass of the Lord's Supper, the Blessed Sacrament is placed on the Altar of Repose in the church for Adoration. During the Seven Churches Visitation, the faithful visit several churches – sometimes seven, sometimes fourteen, sometimes no set number depending upon the particular practice – to pray before the Blessed Sacrament in each church. The Seven Churches Visitation has been done in an ecumenical context, involving Christians of the Catholic, Methodist, Episcopal, Aglipayan, and Salvationist traditions, among others.

History
The tradition of visiting seven churches on Holy Thursday probably originated in Rome, as early pilgrims visited the seven basilicas as penance.

The Via Francigena was an ancient pilgrim route between England and Rome. It was customary to end the pilgrimage with a visit to the tombs of Sts Peter and Paul. In 1300 Pope Boniface VIII declared the first Holy Year, granting a special indulgence to those, who meeting the requisite conditions, visited St. Peter's Basilica and the Basilica of Saint Paul Outside the Walls. Over time, the number of prescribed churches increased to seven.

The tradition of visiting all seven churches was started by Philip Neri around 1553. He and a few friends would gather before dawn and set out on their "Seven Churches Walk". These pilgrimages were designed to be a counterpoint to the raucous behavior of Carnival. The Walks became very popular and began to attract others.

Practice
After the Mass of the Lord's Supper, during which Christians remember Jesus Christ's last meal with his Apostles on the night that he was arrested, the faithful remember Jesus's Agony in the Garden. After Mass, the main altar and most side altars are stripped; all crosses are either removed or covered; the Blessed Sacrament is placed in a tabernacle on the Altar of Repose, and churches are open late for silent adoration. This is in response to the request Jesus made to his apostles while they were in the Garden of Gethsemane, as recorded in Gospel of Matthew 26:40, "Could you not, then, watch one hour with me?"

Those who practice this visitation leave the church where they attended the Mass of the Lord's Supper and travel to nearby churches to pray before the Blessed Sacrament. This is more common in urban areas where churches are in close proximity, thus making traveling easier. There are no set prayers in the Catholic Church for this devotion, except to pray for the intentions of the reigning Pope and recite the Lord's Prayer, Hail Mary, and Gloria Patri. People also opt to pray the Stations of the Cross.

Saint Philip Neri drew up an itinerary in order to combine conviviality and the sharing of a common religious experience by discovering of the heritage of the early Saints. In modern times, pilgrimages are often arranged by parish organizations and co-ordinated with other parishes in the area.

Various countries

India
In India, the custom is to visit fourteen churches, one per Station of the Cross. This is traditionally performed on Maundy Thursday evening, but the pilgrimage is more often performed on the morning of Good Friday or on any other day of Lent. Usually, whole families would participate, customarily fasting for the duration of the rite, but nowadays it is also undertaken by parish devotional groups.

Malta
In Malta, the visits may occur either after the evening Mass on Maundy Thursday, or on Good Friday until the start of the 3 PM service. While it is the tradition to visit different churches, individual churches often organise seven short processions around the church. The prayers for the visits are said inside, in front of the Altar of Repose (Maltese: sepulkru), while the Rosary is recited during the processions.

Philippines

In the Philippines, the tradition is called Visita Iglesia. The general practice is to visit seven churches either on Maundy Thursday or Good Friday, and recite the Stations of the Cross. The pious and able would double the number of churches to fourteen, while the infirm and elderly usually visit only one or a handful. Until the 1970s, people recited all fourteen Stations in each church, but the more recent form is to pray two Stations per church.

The more devout would carry a wooden cross with them, while others consider the ritual an opportunity for sightseeing. An offering is usually made at each church and to the poor as a form of almsgiving. To accommodate the faithful, many Catholic churches during Holy Week remain open until midnight. While traditionally done on Maundy Thursday, after the Mass of the Last Supper, it is now common to perform Visita Iglesia on any day during Holy Week.

Since 2010, a bicycle tour version known as Bisikleta Iglesia has gained popularity: pilgrims would bike along a route covering seven churches, and as a group pray the Stations in the usual manner.

Singapore
In Singapore, the visiting of churches occurs shortly after the evening Mass of the Last Supper. Prayers at each church consist of seven repetitions of the Lord's Prayer, Ave Maria, and the Gloria Patri. Due to the new trend of late Mass times (sometimes 7 or 8 pm) to allow for more churchgoers, eight churches are the maximum number visited (even in the city area, where these are closer to each other than in outer residential areas) before these close at midnight. A festive atmosphere exists, with the sale of drinks, hot cross buns and other local snacks like the traditional kueh ko chee. Observant Catholics have a 'Last Supper' meal in anticipation of the next day's fast.

United States

In the US, Holy Week observances in a particular area often reflect the traditions of the immigrant population who settled there.
 In Buffalo, New York the pilgrimage is promoted by a local neighborhood preservation group to highlight the cultural heritage of immigrant parishes. In 2014 the group handled over 700 requests for pilgrimage/tour information.
 In New Orleans it is customary to visit nine churches on Good Friday.
 The Seven Churches Visitation has been done in an ecumenical context, involving Christians of the Catholic, Methodist, Episcopal and Salvationist traditions, among others. Following the Stations of the Cross devotion, believers process to each church in sequence, stopping to pray at every one of the seven churches.

See also
 Seven Pilgrim Churches of Rome

References

External links
 Visita Iglesia website of the Catholic Bishops Conference of the Philippines
 Broadway Fillmore Alive website of the One Night and Seven Churches in Buffalo, NY - USA

Catholic holy days
Lent
Holy Week
Holy Week processions